DXDV (945 AM) was a radio station owned and operated by Vismin Radio and Television Broadcasting Network. Its studios and transmitter were located in Butuan.

References

Radio stations established in 1959
Radio stations disestablished in 2007
Radio stations in Butuan
Defunct radio stations in the Philippines